Ganoblemmus is a genus of crickets in tribe Gryllini; species are recorded from Africa.

Taxonomy
The genus contains the following species:
Ganoblemmus flavipes Sjöstedt, 1900
Ganoblemmus flavopictus (Bolívar, 1893)
Ganoblemmus rasilis Karsch, 1893
Ganoblemmus rhodocephalus Gorochov, 1996
Ganoblemmus rufotibialis Gorochov, 1996

References

Gryllinae
Orthoptera genera
Taxa named by Ferdinand Karsch